Lieutenant Colonel Archibald E. Roberts (1915–2005) was commissioned a 2nd Lieutenant in the U.S. Army on 19 December 1942 and served as a paratrooper in the 11th Airborne Division.  In 1959 he served as the information officer for Major General Edwin Walker who was the commander of the 24th Infantry Division in Germany. Roberts wrote and directed the program "Pro Blue" troop information program in 1959. It was named after the color of some Army maps. General Walker was relieved of command in 1961 after the accusation that he and LTC Roberts had distributed John Birch Society literature to troops under them in that program.

Roberts was forced out of the Army after 18 years of service because he made a political speech to the Daughters of the American Revolution. This prevented him from collecting his retirement pay.  He successfully sued the Army for reinstatement.  Colonel Roberts remained active in right wing political activities for many years after his retirement.  This includes many appearances on Denver area talk radio shows.  He is the author of The Most Secret Science. This book claims that there is ancient science of control of large populations by a small ruling class.

Books
 Victory Denied. Chicago: Chas, Hallberg & Co. (1966). .
 Peace: By the Wonderful People Who Brought You Korea & Vietnam. Fullerton, Calif.: Educator Publications (1972). Foreword by John R. Rarick. .
 The Republic: Decline and Future Promise. Fort Collins, Colo.: Betsy Ross Press (1975). . 96 p.
 The Anatomy of a Revolution. Fort Collins, Colo.: Betsy Ross Press (1975). 32 p.
 Emerging Struggle for State Sovereignty. Fort Collins, Colo.: Betsy Ross Press (1979). . 301 p. 
 The Most Secret Science. Fort Collins, Colo.: Betsy Ross Press (1988).
 America in Crisis Survival Portfolio. Fort Collins, Colo.: Betsy Ross Press (1992).

References

Further reading
 "Archibald E. Roberts biography." Washington, D.C.: Group Research Inc. (1963). .

External links 
The Most Secret Science

Emerging Struggle for State Sovereignty

2005 deaths
1915 births
United States Army colonels
People from Cheboygan, Michigan
Far-right politics in the United States
American conspiracy theorists
Activists from Colorado
Military personnel from Michigan